Windthorst High School is a public high school located in Windthorst, Texas (USA) and classified as a 2A school by the UIL. It is part of the Windthorst Independent School District located in eastern Archer County. In 2013, the school was rated "Met Standard" by the Texas Education Agency.

Athletics
The Windthorst Trojans compete in the following sports 

Baseball
Basketball
Cross Country
Football
Golf
Softball
Tennis
Track and Field
Volleyball

State Titles
Baseball 
2010(1A)
Football 
1996(1A), 2003(1A), 2020(2A)
Softball 
2004(1A), 2005(1A)
Volleyball 
1992(1A), 1993(1A), 1994(1A), 1997(1A), 1998(1A), 1999(1A), 2000(1A), 2001(1A), 2002(1A), 2004(1A), 2005(1A), 2007(1A), 2008(1A), 2022(2A)

References

External links
Windthorst ISD

Schools in Archer County, Texas
Public high schools in Texas